The siege of Anjadiva in 1-16 March 1506 occurred when the Muslim ruler of Goa fought to expel the Portuguese from the Fort Anjediva they had established there. Adil Shah of Bijapur was the invader. This, combined with other reasons, forced the Portuguese to leave the settlement.

Notes

History of Kerala
Portuguese colonisation in Asia
1506 in India
Conflicts in 1506
Anjadiva
1506 in Portugal